The Ashurbeyovs or Ashurbeylis are an Azerbaijani noble family, with an extensive history and bloodline.

History
The Ashurbeyov family originated from Ashur khan Afshar. Ashur khan was Nadir shah's relative, and due to this, he became governor of Tabriz, then vicar of Iranian Azerbaijan during the reign of Nadir shah. In 1743, he participated in suppression of Sam Mirza's rebellion, who posed himself as the descendant of the Safavids.  Nadir shah presented  lands in Absheron peninsula, including Sabunchu, Keshly and Zabrat to Ashur khan according to these merits. A lot of members of Ashur bey's family settled in these possessions.

Ashur khan had five sons: Abdulla bey, Haji Imamverdi bey, Danial bey, Aliyar bey and Allahverdi bey. Ashur bey-elder son of Haji Imamverdi bey possessed Sabunchu and Zabrat villages "on the rights of khan" at the last khan of Baku and at Russian administration. During the Russo-Persian War he supported the dethroned khan of Baku-Huseyngulu Khan, who came to Baku with shakh's army and besieged the city. After suffering defeat in the war the Persian army  began to move back to  South and Huseyngulu khan followed them and moved to South. The beys supporting the khan came to him and Ashur bey was also among them with his son Ahmed bey and some members of the family. Their property was allocated among his relatives. In 1873, "The Commission of Beys" confirmed the bey origin of this family in the following way: posterity of elder sons of Ashur khan Afshar-Haji Imamverdi bey and Allahverdi bey was recognized in hereditary bey dignity under the surname of the Ashurbeyovs. Further a lot of representatives of this family have Ashurbeyli or Ashurli surname. At the end of the 19th century, large oil fields were discovered in ancestral lands of the Ashurbeyovs, due to which the Ashurbeyovs became one of the richest families of pre-revolutionary Baku.

Well-known representatives

•Ashur bey Haji Imamverdi bey oglu-elder grandson of Ashur khan Afshar possessed Sabunchu and Zabrat villages in Absheron, and also possessed arable lands and crocus plantations. After unsuccessful attempt of Huseyngulu khan to retrieve the throne in 1826, he escaped to Persia with his family.

•Ahmed bey Ashur bey oglu-in 1826, escaped to Persia with his father and other members of the family.

•Nabat khanim Gojabey gizi (1795–1912) was Haji Imamverdi bey Ashur khan oglu's granddaughter. Nabat khanim was married to wealthy merchant Haji Musa Rza Rzayev, from this marriage had a son Haji Abbasgulu Rzayev and daughters Ashraf and Gulbista. Nabat khanim possessed multi-million capital consisting of oil fields and apartment houses and was famed as philanthropist. She donated the great amount of money for construction of water conduit Shollar, and also participated in financing of hospitals in Sabunchu, where poor and orphans were treated at her expense. Nabat khanim participated in financing of a construction of the biggest mosque of Baku-Taza Pir, for which the well-known architect Ziverbey Ahmadbeyov was invited. She allocated money for the architect and sent him to trip to the Eastern countries, where he had to learn the architecture of mosques. After his return he presented project of the mosque with two-tier minarets. The construction began in 1905 and ended in 1914. But because of the intervention of provincial authorities minarets were built only up to the first tier. Nabat khanim invited Haji Zeynalabdin Taghiyev for layer of the first stone to foundation of the mosque, who put the last stone at the end of the construction, but Nabat khanim couldn't live until the end of the construction and after her death her son Haji Abbasgulu Rzayev was engaged in this work.

•Teymur bey Gara bey oglu (1834-September, 1908)-was Haji Imamverdi bey Ashur khan oglu's grandson. Teymur bey was the owner of extensive lands and oil fields in Sabunchu. He was engaged in charity work. In particular, schools and hospitals were built in Sabunchu and were reconstructed mosques at his expense. Teymur bey was married to Tutu khanim-inhabitant of Zabrat village and had two sons-Bala bey and Ali bey and also daughters-Javahir khanim, Beyim khanim and Umm Leyla khanim. In 1904, a mansion was built in Gogol street by Iosif Vikentyevich Goslavskiy's project, which Teymur bey presented to his son as a wedding gift. After his death, his wife fulfilling the deceased's will, sent his body accompanied by forty pilgrims to Karbala-the sacred for Muslim-Shias city. After burying her husband, she built mosque on his grave.

•Meshadi Agasi bey Ashurbeyov-oilman. Possessed oil fields in Sabunchu. Died in 1925.

•Isa bey Haji Mehtigulu bey oglu Ashurbeyov-philanthropist and social activist. Isa bey was born in 1878. Financed the newspaper "Irshad", which was published under Ahmad bey Aghayev's edition. Was one of the leaders of "Hummet" party. Was the member of the administration of "Nijat" union. Died in 1938.

•Haji Ajdar bey Gojabey oglu Ashurbeyov (1855–1921)-the well-known oilman and philanthropist. Haji Ajdar bey financed the construction of the Blue Mosque in Baku, the construction of which was continued from March 1912 to December 1913. The project of the mosque was by the architect Ziverbey Ahmadbeyov.

•Bala bey Teymur bey oglu Ashurbeyov-Teymur bey Ashurbeyov's son and the father of well-known Azerbaijani historian Sara Ashurbeyli. Bala bey was born in 1882. He was involved in entrepreneurial activity. After collapse of the Azerbaijan Democratic Republic he moved to Istanbul with his family. He returned to Baku with his brother's advice during the NEP period, where he was arrested and exiled to Karaganda, where he was shot in 1937. In 1965, Bala bey Ashurbeyov was posthumously rehabilitated.

•Sara Bala bey gizi Ashurbeyli (January 27, 1906 – July 17, 2001)-Bala bey Ashurbeyov's daughter. Eminent Azerbaijani historian, Doctor of Historical Sciences.

•Igor Ashurbeyli (September 9, 1963)-Russian entrepreneur, former general director of OJSC Concern PVO "Almaz-Antey".

•Danial Ahmed bey oglu Ashurbeyov was born on May 19, 1976, in Baku. Director of directorate of general programs in Azerbaijan State Television and Radio.

The mansion of the Ashurbeyovs

The mansion of the Ashurbeyovs was built in 1904, by the architect Iosif Vikentyevich Goslavsky's project in laundry (Gogol street) street. There was office of their firm on the first floor. On the second floor lived Bala bey with his family. Teymur bey's brother and Teymur bey's widow lived on the third floor. This mansion was Teymur bey's wedding gift to his younger son Bala bey. Being student in Tbilisi, Bala bey fell in love with Ismet khanim Sultanova. Then his father decided to build luxurious house.

Main entrances of the house were adorned with paintings, in which participated well-known artist of Baku on Bala bey's invitation. During March incidents some part of the mansion was plundered, but governess of Bala bey's children a Frenchwoman Greylo hung the French flag out, posing it as the building of French mission and thereby she could guard the greater part of the house against the plunder.

Photo gallery

References

Noble families
Azerbaijani nobility
Afsharid dynasty
Azerbaijani noble families
Azerbaijani families
Surnames
Ashurbeyli family